Raquel Brailowsky-Cabrera was a Paraguayan-born Puerto Rican social anthropologist and Professor of Anthropology and Sociology at the Interamerican University of Puerto Rico, San Germán Campus.

Biography
Born in Asunción, Paraguay, she came to Puerto Rico at an early age. She hold a BA from the University of Puerto Rico at Rio Piedras and a MA and PhD from the State University of New York at Stony Brook.

She published extensively on topics like popular culture and folklore. Her research focused on the mask festivities of the northern area of Puerto Rico. Her thesis, A Study of Popular Culture: Masked Festivities in San Sebastian, Puerto Rico, studies Puerto Rican popular culture. She is also the author of the Anthropology chapter in Lina Torres's textbook Introduction to Social Sciences.
Other research includes women, medicinal plants, and the Caribbean. She was a member of national and international organizations such as the Caribbean Studies Association, Latin American Studies Association and Puerto Rico's Historians Association.

Education
BA in humanities, magna cum laude, from the University of Puerto Rico at Rio Piedras.
MA in history and PhD in social anthropology from the State University of New York at Stony Brook.

References

Living people
Social anthropologists
Puerto Rican anthropologists
Paraguayan emigrants to Puerto Rico
Paraguayan Jews
Puerto Rican sociologists
People from Asunción
Stony Brook University alumni
University of Puerto Rico alumni
Women sociologists
Paraguayan women anthropologists
Puerto Rican women anthropologists
Year of birth missing (living people)